Jan Szylling (fl. c. 1500) was a Polish Scholastic philosopher.

Life
Jan Szylling, a native of Kraków, studied with Jacques Lefèvre d'Étaples (in Latin, Jacobus Faber Stapulensis) in Paris, France, in the first years of the 16th century. Later he was a cathedral canon in Kraków.

When Nominalism was revived in western Europe at the turn of the sixteenth century, particularly thanks to Lefèvre d'Étaples, it presently reappeared in Kraków and began taking the upper hand there once more over Thomism and Scotism.  It was Jan Szylling who reintroduced it to Kraków.

See also
History of philosophy in Poland
List of Poles

Notes

References
 Władysław Tatarkiewicz, Historia filozofii (History of Philosophy), volume one, Warsaw, Państwowe Wydawnictwo Naukowe, 1978.

1500 births
People from Kraków
Year of death unknown
15th-century Polish philosophers
16th-century Polish philosophers